Quinçay is a commune in the Vienne department in the Nouvelle-Aquitaine region in western France.

Population

Places of interest 
 The castle of Masseuil (Château de Masseuil) is listed.
 The door of the Quinçay church has been listed in 1926.
 The wash-house on Auxance river
 The logis of Pré-Bernard.
 The fountain of Ringère

See also
Communes of the Vienne department

References

Communes of Vienne